William Robert Hamilton (February 16, 1866 – December 15, 1940), nicknamed Sliding Billy, was an American professional baseball player in Major League Baseball (MLB) during the 19th-century. He played for the Kansas City Cowboys, Philadelphia Phillies and Boston Beaneaters between 1888 and 1901.

Hamilton won the National League (NL) batting title twice and led the NL in stolen bases five times, eclipsing 100 on four occasions. He hit over .400 in 1894 and set the major league record for runs scored in a season with 198. His 914 stolen bases ranks third all time. A career .344 hitter, he was elected to the National Baseball Hall of Fame in 1961 via the Veterans Committee.

Early life
Hamilton was born on February 16, 1866 in Newark, New Jersey. His parents, Samuel and Mary Hamilton, had emigrated to New Jersey from Ireland. According to biographer Roy Kerr, there is evidence to suggest Hamilton was descended from the Ulster Scots people. (As an adult, Hamilton was known to proudly proclaim his Scottish ancestry.) When Hamilton was a small child, his family moved to Clinton, Massachusetts. He worked in a Clinton cotton mill as a young teenager.

Professional career
Hamilton broke into the major leagues in the American Association with the Kansas City Cowboys in 1888. He established himself as a star the following season by batting .301 with 144 runs and 111 stolen bases. In 1890, the Cowboys, who were ceasing operations, sold Hamilton to the Philadelphia Phillies. The next year he led the NL in batting average (.340), runs scored (141) and hits (179). For a third consecutive season, Hamilton led the NL in stolen bases.

In 1892, Hamilton hit both a leadoff and game-ending home run in the same game. Only Vic Power (1957), Darin Erstad (2000), Reed Johnson (2003) and Ian Kinsler (2009) have accomplished the same feat. He hit .380 in 1893, which led the major leagues.

Philadelphia outfielders Hamilton, Sam Thompson, Ed Delahanty and Tuck Turner all hit over .400 in 1894. That year Hamilton set the all-time standard for most runs scored in a season (198); since then, Babe Ruth has come closest to Hamilton in runs scored, with 177 in 1921, setting the American League and modern MLB record. Hamilton also set the record for most stolen bases in one game, with seven on August 31, 1894. He set the record for most consecutive games scoring one or more runs, with 35 runs in 24 games in July–August 1894.

Hamilton led the league in steals for a fifth time in 1895. In 1896, Hamilton moved to Boston, for whom he played his final six seasons. Although his numbers declined, Hamilton still scored over 100 runs in all but two of those seasons.

Hamilton retired after the 1901 season. Over his career he compiled 912 (or 937; see this article's "legacy" section) stolen bases, a .344 batting average and 1690 runs in 1591 games; he is one of only three players to average more than a run per game played. His .455 career on-base percentage ranks fourth all-time behind Ted Williams, Babe Ruth and John McGraw, and his 912 stolen bases ranks third behind Rickey Henderson and Lou Brock.

He is the Philadelphia Phillies career leader in batting average (.361), on-base percentage (.468) and stolen bases (508). He holds Phillies single-season records for on-base percentage (.523 in 1894), runs (196 in 1894), stolen bases (111 in 1891) and times on base (355 in 1894).

Legacy
Though stolen bases were credited differently during Hamilton's career than they are in modern times, he was very proud of his stolen base marks. In 1937, Hamilton lambasted the Sporting News in a letter he wrote to them, stating, "I was and will be the greatest base stealer of all time. I stole over 100 bases on many years and if they ever re-count the record I will get my just reward."

Later life
After his playing days ended, Hamilton managed several minor league teams in Pennsylvania and Massachusetts and served as a scout with the Boston Nationals.

Hamilton died on December 15, 1940, at his home at 6 Lucian Street in Worcester, Massachusetts. He was survived by his wife Rebecca (Carr) Hamilton, four daughters and two grandchildren. He was inducted into the Baseball Hall of Fame in 1961.

See also

 List of Major League Baseball career hits leaders
 List of Major League Baseball career runs scored leaders
 List of Major League Baseball batting champions
 List of Major League Baseball stolen base records
 List of Major League Baseball career stolen bases leaders
 List of Major League Baseball annual runs scored leaders
 List of Major League Baseball annual stolen base leaders
 List of Philadelphia Phillies team records

Notes
  His career steals total differs, based on the source. Hamilton's plaque in the Baseball Hall of Fame credits him with 937 steals, while MLB.com credits him with 912 steals and Baseball Reference.com credits him with 914 steals.
  While most sources list this date of birth, biographer Roy Kerr writes that Newark archives suggest a date of birth of February 15, 1866.

References

External links

National Baseball Hall of Fame inductees
National League batting champions
National League stolen base champions
Kansas City Cowboys players
Philadelphia Phillies players
Boston Beaneaters players
19th-century baseball players
Major League Baseball center fielders
Baseball players from Newark, New Jersey
Minor league baseball managers
Waterbury Brass Citys players
Worcester Grays players
Haverhill Hustlers players
Harrisburg Senators players
Lynn Shoemakers players
1866 births
1940 deaths
Player-coaches